The World Avocado Congress (WAC) is a quadrennial meeting of avocado producers, researchers, marketers and other interested parties from several countries, for the purpose of information sharing and networking.

History
The congress was founded by Jan Toerien. The first WAC was held in Johannesburg, South Africa in 1987. During the planning session for the second WAC in 1991 Dr. Mary-Lu Arpaia, a researcher from the University of California Riverside, proposed that an International Avocado Society (IAS) be formed and charged with the responsibility of organizing the WAC every four years. It was accepted by vote and the IAS was formed, with representatives from different countries selected for its initial organizing committee. At the first meeting of these representatives on 26 April 1991, Hank Brokaw and Dr. Arpaia was elected as co-chairs.

List of Congresses

References

Avocado
International conferences
1987 establishments in California